WJCL (channel 22) is a television station in Savannah, Georgia, United States, affiliated with ABC. Owned by Hearst Television, the station maintains a transmitter in unincorporated western Chatham County, near Bloomingdale. Its studios are located in the Savannah Morning News building on Chatham Parkway in Savannah. The building also houses its former sister station, Hardeeville, South Carolina–licensed Fox affiliate WTGS (channel 28, now owned by the Sinclair Broadcast Group), which now operates separately from WJCL.

History

The station began operations on July 18, 1970. It was the fourth television station to launch in Savannah and immediately became the area's first-ever primary ABC affiliate. Prior to channel 22 signing on, CBS affiliate WTOC-TV (channel 11) and NBC affiliate WSAV-TV (channel 3) shared secondary affiliations with ABC. Originally owned by former Savannah mayor and avid amateur radio operator Julius Curtis Lewis, Jr. (whose initials provided the call sign), the station marked many "firsts".

Local color news film and reel-to-reel videotape were introduced to the Savannah market by WJCL. It claims to have been the first station in the area to televise a live event (President Richard Nixon's Savannah visit and ride in a parade on Skidaway Road) as well as broadcasting in stereo. WJCL-TV and WJCL-FM (96.5 FM) were both run by Lewis Broadcasting's Executive Vice President, J. Fred Pierce, from 1972 until the television station's first sale in 1999. Channel 22 dropped the -TV suffix from the callsign in 1981.

In 1982, WJCL swapped affiliations with WSAV (due to the latter's action) and became an NBC affiliate. In 1985, WSAV was one of several ABC affiliates nationwide unhappy with the network's weak prime time programming offerings. However, a mere three years later, it returned to ABC in 1985, while WSAV reverted to being an NBC affiliate full-time. When Lewis purchased the WNOK television and radio stations in Columbia, South Carolina in 1977, he quickly sold off WNOK radio (for an undisclosed price) and immediately changed the television outlet's callsign to WLTX. In 1982, he purchased WYEA in Columbus, Georgia from AFLAC and changed its calls to WLTZ to follow a similar call letter format used for his station in South Carolina's capitol ("LT" meaning "Lewis Television").

In the early 1990s, Lewis sold two of his radio stations, WSTZ-FM and WSTZ-AM in Jackson, Mississippi for an undisclosed price. In 1999, Lewis Broadcasting sold WJCL to Grapevine Communications, which merged with Piedmont Television around the same time. In the mid-to-late 1990s, Lewis decided to divest an even larger portion of his media interests and sold four of his combined eight owned and/or previously owned radio and television stations including WJCL, WTGS, WJCL-FM, and WLTX. Lewis died in 2005, and on May 1, 2007, Lewis Broadcasting, by then owned by his son, Julius Curtis Lewis III, entered into an agreement with SagamoreHill Broadcasting to sell-off its last remaining television station, WLTZ. In 1995, WJCL became a charter UPN affiliate as a secondary basis until 1997 when former WB affiliate WUBI took over the UPN affiliation.

In 2001, WJCL partnered with Carleton Public Relations, Inc. to produce ABC 22 LawCall. Radio on-air personality Lexie Kaye was hired by Carleton Public Relations as producer of the weekly live, legal call-in show. The program featured Mike Avery as host along with attorneys from the Carter & Tate firm with a weekly guest and various topics. This was the first legal call-in show in the nation to use the "LawCall" name. The show aired until June 2006 on Sunday nights from 11 to 11:30. WJCL and WTGS were sold to New Vision Television (in an ironic twist, a prior incarnation of New Vision once owned rival WSAV) and Parkin Broadcasting respectively in 2007. The station unveiled a new blog-based website in June 2007.

On November 2, 2007, it was announced that with the recent acquisition of WJCL by New Vision, a brand new website was on the way. The revamped website (operated largely in-house with technology borrowed from Broadcast Interactive Media) featured the usual news, weather, and sports along with streaming video. In January 2009, the websites of WJCL and several of its sister stations migrated to the Inergize Digital Network platform (with KOIN in Portland, Oregon, being the first station in the New Vision group featuring it). The station is the setting of the second season of TV Guide Network's Making News which began airing on June 4, 2008.

On May 7, 2012, LIN TV Corporation announced that it will acquire the New Vision Television station group for $330.4 million and the assumption of $12 million in debt. Along with the outright ownership of WJCL, the agreement includes the acquisition of New Vision's shared services agreement with Parkin Broadcasting, giving LIN operational control of WTGS. On October 2, the FCC approved the proposed sale to LIN TV. The transaction was completed on October 12.

On March 21, 2014, LIN Media entered into an agreement to merge with Media General in a $1.6 billion deal. Because Media General already owned NBC affiliate WSAV-TV, the companies were required to sell either WSAV or WJCL to another station owner in order to comply with FCC ownership rules as well as planned changes to those rules regarding same-market television stations which would prohibit sharing agreements. On August 20, 2014, Media General announced that it would keep WSAV and sell WJCL, along with WVTM-TV in Birmingham, Alabama, to Hearst Television, with WTGS going to Sinclair Broadcast Group. The sale was completed on December 19, and Hearst closed on its purchase of WJCL and WVTM on December 22.

Programming

Syndicated programming
Syndicated programming on WJCL includes Extra, Inside Edition, The Ellen DeGeneres Show and The Doctors among others.

News operation
Through a news share agreement established in 1996, WJCL produces a prime time newscast on its now-former sister station (known as WTGS Fox News at Ten). For a while, WTGS also simulcasted WJCL's Good Morning Show on weekdays (from 5 until 7) but it was dropped at some point. WTGS replaced WJCL's newscast with one produced by its own stations WPDE-TV in June 2016.

WJCL and WTGS combined operations with the Savannah Morning News and be relocated to the newspaper's facility on Chatham Parkway in Savannah. The stations began broadcasting at their new location on October 4, 2011. The station has an hour of news at 5 p.m. with a weekday morning show that airs WTGS from 7 until 8. WJCL does not air a midday show during the week, but did add weekend morning newscasts in March 2020.

Notable former on-air staff
 Rob Fowler – meteorologist (1982; now at WCBD in Charleston)
 Audrey Puente – meteorologist; now at WNYW
 Rich Edson – Washington correspondent, Fox News Channel

Technical information

Subchannels
The station's digital signal is multiplexed:

Analog-to-digital conversion
WJCL discontinued regular programming on its analog signal, over UHF channel 22, on February 17, 2009, the original target date in which full-power television stations in the United States were to transition from analog to digital broadcasts under federal mandate (which was later pushed back to June 12, 2009). The station's digital signal relocated from its pre-transition UHF channel 23 to channel 22.

References

"Channel 22 On The Air Tomorrow," The Savannah Morning News Friday July 17, 1970, p. B1
"Welcome, WJCL-TV," The Savannah Morning News Saturday, July 18, 1970, p. A4
"WJCL Makes Debut," The Savannah Morning News Sunday, July 19, 1970, p. C1

External links
Official website

Television channels and stations established in 1970
JCL (TV)
ABC network affiliates
Hearst Television
1970 establishments in Georgia (U.S. state)
MeTV affiliates